Howard is a 2018 American documentary film written and directed by Don Hahn about the life of songwriter Howard Ashman. It received positive reviews from critics.

Summary
The film documents the life of songwriter Howard Ashman, who wrote the lyrics for the songs in the Disney animated films The Little Mermaid, Beauty and the Beast and Aladdin, as well as the stage musical, Little Shop of Horrors, and who died in 1991, at the age of 40.

The film uses the same interview presentation as Hahn's previous documentary, Waking Sleeping Beauty, where rather than "talking heads", audio interviews are used with "speech bubbles" indicating who is speaking.

Music
Alan Menken composed the score for the film, while Chris Bacon adapted it. Menken, who worked with Ashman on several projects until the latter's passing, first became involved with the project during the 2017–18 Christmas season; when Hahn showed a reel of the movie to Menken, he told Hahn that "[he has] to score this movie". Hahn originally opposed, as the budget wouldn't allow him to pay Menken, but agreed once Menken told Hahn that he saw the project as his opportunity to create a musical homage to Ashman. According to Hahn, Menken composed the score during the holiday season, and describe his score as "one of the most personal and touching scores that [he had heard] from him". Menken said that he wanted to "find a motif that simply expressed [his] feelings about Howard". Menken also said that the score has "a childlike quality to it, certainly, a simplicity to it. There's a certain shimmering and anticipation of a door opening and what happens just before it's revealed - this thing [Hahn has] created".

Releases
Howard premiered at the 2018 Tribeca Film Festival and was nominated for the Best Documentary Award at the 2018 Heartland Film Festival. After having a limited theatrical run on December 18, 2018, the film was released on Disney+ on August 7, 2020.

Reception

Critical response 
The critical consensus reads, "Howard serves as a bittersweet tribute to the life and legacy of a brilliant artist whose timeless songs served as the soundtrack for a generation of Disney fans." On Metacritic, the film has a weighted average score of 76 out of 100, based on 13 critics, indicating "generally favorable reviews."

Frank Scheck of The Hollywood Reporter stated the documentary provides an insightful commentary, with a large and fascinating amount of archival footage, and called Howard a tribute to Howard Ashman, writing, "It succeeds beautifully in inducing both joy and sorrow: joy at the remarkable work Ashman produced, and sorrow that he left us so early and deprived us of the talent that still had so much to give." Melissa Leon of The Daily Beast found the documentary touching, and said it manages to highlight Ashman's personal life and his work, stating, "The film is riddled with gems from the production of now-iconic films [...] and insight into the life and legacy of a man whose lyrics everyone knows, yet whose premature death fewer are familiar with."

Peter Travers of Rolling Stone rated the documentary 4 out of 5 stars, found the film to be a moving tribute to Ashman, writing, "Such blunt honesty and rare introspection sets Howard apart from the usual cut-and-paste trips down memory lane." Peter Bradshaw of The Guardian called the documentary exciting and emotional, saying the film immerses its audience in the life of a creative artist, stating, "Ashman set a standard of flair, invention and Broadway-style showmanship in Disney lyrics that continues to this day." Jennifer Green of Common Sense Media rated the film 4 out of 5 stars, praised the depiction of positive messages and role models, citing creativity and solidarity, saying, "Howard is a moving documentary that offers both a behind-the-scenes look at the making of some modern-classic Disney animated films and the poignant life story of an exceptionally talented man."

Accolades

See also
 Waking Sleeping Beauty
 Smile
 Little Shop of Horrors
 The Little Mermaid
 Beauty and the Beast
 Aladdin

References

External links
 
 
 

2018 films
Collage film
2020s English-language films
Disney documentary films
2018 documentary films
Films about Disney
Documentary films about animation
Documentary films about Hollywood, Los Angeles
Documentary films about theatre
2018 LGBT-related films
American LGBT-related films
Gay-related films
Disney Renaissance
Disney+ original films
Films directed by Don Hahn
Films produced by Don Hahn
Films scored by Alan Menken
Films about filmmaking
2010s English-language films
2010s American films